Jandu is a Sikh surname. The Jandu surname derives from the Sikh warriors confederation (military group) from North India, Punjab. 

Jandu Sikh is the community encompassing members of the (Tarkhan) Ramgharia group of Punjab India. 

Traditionally, the Jandu clans had occupations such as farming, carpentry and blacksmiths, some then later diversified into the steel and construction industries. 

As such skills were in demand, Indian families moved to East Africa (Kenya, Uganda, Tanzania) to work on the construction and development of the railways, as well as other related roles which required those skills.

Due to the creation of the East Africa Protectorate in 1895, many Indians migrated from India to East Africa from 1895 to the 1960s.

However, when Kenya gained independence on 1 June 1963, some Indian families who were situated in East Africa had the choice to either acquire Kenyan citizenship or apply for British citizenship.

This led to many Indian families to migrate to the UK from East Africa (Kenya, Uganda, Tanzania) from the early 1960s. 

Notable people with the name include:
Harbans Jandu, Indian composer

Sikh names